Religious conflict may refer to:

 Religious violence
 Religious war
 European wars of religion
 Religious intolerance
 Religious controversies

See also
 Crusade (disambiguation)
 Holy War (disambiguation)
 Jihad (disambiguation)
 Sacred War (disambiguation)
 War of Religion (disambiguation)